Luke List may refer to:

 Luke List (golfer) (born 1985), American professional golfer
 Luke List (cricketer) (born 1977), former English cricketer